The 1900 Villanova Wildcats football team represented the Villanova University during the 1900 college football season. The team's captain was John Powers.

Schedule

Notes

References

Villanova
Villanova Wildcats football seasons
Villanova Wildcats football